Gay Township is a township in Taylor County, Iowa, USA.

History
Gay Township was established in 1869.

References

Townships in Taylor County, Iowa
Townships in Iowa
1869 establishments in Iowa
Populated places established in 1869